Maria Furnace is a South Mountain populated place on Toms Creek in Adams County, Pennsylvania, United States, west of Fairfield, that was the location of an 1822 blast furnace until operations were moved to Caledonia.  The remains of the original blast furnace ("Maria Furnace") are located at coordinates: 39|46|30.64 N,  77|24|25.98 W.  The remains consist of a pile of rocks in a small wooded area overgrown with vegetation.

References

1822 establishments in Pennsylvania
Populated places established in 1822
Unincorporated communities in Adams County, Pennsylvania
Unincorporated communities in Pennsylvania